Hollywood Vampires is the self-titled debut studio album by American rock supergroup Hollywood Vampires, formed in 2015 by Alice Cooper, Johnny Depp and Joe Perry to honor the music of the rock stars who died from excess in the 1970s. Released on September 11, 2015 for Republic Records, the album features guest appearances by Paul McCartney, Robby Krieger, Orianthi, Dave Grohl, Christopher Lee, Slash, Brian Johnson, Joe Walsh, Perry Farrell, and Zak Starkey amongst others.

Content
At his shows, Alice Cooper often performs cover songs as a tribute to his drinking buddies The Hollywood Vampires. For an album of covers based on the latter, Cooper wanted songs specific to their early 70s era. "Jim Morrison and Jimi Hendrix of course were before the Vampires," he conceded. "But they were, like, early, early-breed Vampires. They would have been there every single night."

The songs duly hail from acts who fit the original group's "lore", with the exception of two new tracks by Cooper and Depp titled "My Dead Drunk Friends" and "Raise the Dead". "My Dead Drunk Friends" is named after Cooper's recent favorite turn of phrase. Of that, Cooper says "'My dead drunk friends', they would have laughed at that. It was their sense of humor."

Of McCartney's appearance, Depp recalled: "We're recording live… Alice looks at me with this befuddled little look and he's mouthing the words, 'Oh my god, that's Paul McCartney!' to me… Then I look over at Joe Perry – one of my guitar heroes from when I was a kid – and he looks at me and he says, mouthing it, 'Jesus – look, man, it's Paul McCartney!' It was great to see those two huge stars being starstruck."

The lead track is a spoken word piece titled "The Last Vampire" voiced by Christopher Lee, in which he recites a passage from Bram Stoker's Dracula. This was Lee's final recording for a musical album before his death in June 2015.

A deluxe digital edition was released on February 12, 2016, and features "I'm a Boy", "Seven and Seven Is" and "As Bad as I Am".

Track listing

Personnel

Charts

References

2015 debut albums
Tribute albums to music-related organizations
Albums produced by Bob Ezrin
Hollywood Vampires (band) albums
Covers albums